Missourian may refer to:
Residents of the state of Missouri in the United States.
Columbia Missourian, a newspaper in Columbia, Missouri
Washington Missourian, a newspaper in Washington, Missouri
Missourian (stage), a regional stage in the Carboniferous stratigraphy of North America
, an American cargo ship in service 1921-40